The 2022 Maryland gubernatorial election was held on November 8, 2022, to elect the next governor of Maryland. Governor Larry Hogan, the incumbent two-term Republican, was term-limited and could not seek re-election to a third consecutive term.

The Democratic and Republican primaries were held on July 19, with far-right state delegate Dan Cox securing the Republican nomination, while author and former nonprofit CEO Wes Moore won the Democratic nomination. Political observers gave Moore a strong chance of defeating Cox in the general election in this reliably Democratic state where Democrats outnumber Republicans 2-to-1. Shortly after polls closed, several national news organizations called the election for Moore. Moore became the first African-American governor of Maryland after being sworn in on January 18, 2023.

This race was also one of six Republican-held governorships up for election in 2022 in a state carried by Joe Biden in the 2020 presidential election, and one of three that voted for Biden by double-digits. Moore flipped six counties that had voted for Hogan in 2018, and his electoral strength largely came from densely populated Prince George's County and Baltimore, where he improved on the margins of 2018 Democratic nominee Ben Jealous by roughly 20 percent. Moore's margin of victory was the highest of any gubernatorial candidate in the state since William Donald Schaefer in 1986.

Republican primary

Campaign

Lieutenant Governor Boyd Rutherford, who was seen as the likely Republican frontrunner in the race, announced in April 2021 that he would not seek to succeed Governor Larry Hogan. Kelly Schulz, the Hogan administration's Secretary of Commerce and former Secretary of Labor, announced her candidacy just hours after Rutherford's announcement.

State delegate Dan Cox entered the race in July 2021, and received the endorsement of former President Donald Trump in November. Hogan endorsed Schulz in the primary soon after, setting up a proxy war between Trump and Hogan in the Republican primary. Schulz outpaced Cox in fundraising and had outspent Cox 4–1, but polling showed that the two candidates were running neck-and-neck.

In June 2022, the Democratic Governors Association spent $1.2 million for a television advertisement promoting Cox, hoping he would win the nomination and be easier for Democrats to defeat in November. Schulz and Hogan accused Democrats of meddling in the Republican primary, while Cox denied receiving any support from the DGA, saying that he had "nothing to do with the ad purchase". Some observers, including strategist Jim Dornan, say that two factors — Trump's endorsement and the DGA ad blitz — allowed Cox to advance to the general election. Other observers, including former Maryland lieutenant governor and Republican National Committee chair Michael Steele, say the ads had little impact on voters, highlighting that far-right politician and neo-Confederate activist Michael Peroutka had won the Attorney General primary on the same ballot by an almost identical margin to Cox, even though the DGA did not run any ads on his behalf.

Candidates

Nominee
 Dan Cox, state delegate for the fourth district (2019–2023) and nominee for MD-08 in 2016
 Running mate: Gordana Schifanelli, attorney

Eliminated in primary
 Robin Ficker, former member of the Maryland House of Delegates for district 15B (1979–1983), attorney, sports heckler and perennial candidate
 Running mate: LeRoy F. Yegge Jr.
Kelly Schulz, former Maryland Secretary of Commerce (2019–2022), former Maryland Secretary of Labor (2015–2019) and former member of the Maryland House of Delegates for district 4A (2011–2015)
 Running mate: Jeff Woolford, former Assistant Secretary of the Maryland Department of Health (2021–2022)
 Joe Werner, attorney and Democratic nominee for MD-01 in 2016
 Running mate: Minh Thanh Luong

Declined
Barry Glassman, Harford County executive (2014–2023) (ran for Comptroller)
 Andy Harris, U.S. Representative for Maryland's 1st congressional district (2011–present) (ran for re-election)
 J. B. Jennings, former minority leader of the Maryland Senate (2014–2020) and state senator for the seventh district (ran for re-election, endorsed Schulz)
 Allan Kittleman, former Howard County executive (2014–2018) (ran for Howard County executive, endorsed Schulz)
Kim Klacik, radio talk show host and nominee for Maryland's 7th congressional district in 2020 (endorsed Cox)
 Boyd Rutherford, Lieutenant Governor of Maryland (2015–2023) (endorsed Schulz)
 Michael Steele, former Republican National Committee chairman (2009–2011), nominee for the U.S. Senate in 2006, and former lieutenant governor of Maryland (2003–2007)

Endorsements

Debates and forums
The Legislative Black Caucus of Maryland hosted the first Republican gubernatorial candidate forum on October 15, 2021. Candidates Daniel Cox and Robin Ficker attended the event, where they informed voters of color about their policies surrounding the Black Agenda. Kelly Schulz missed the event due to a prior commitment. At the end of the forum, Darryl Barnes asked all of the attending candidates to post a Black agenda to their campaign websites by November 1; none of the Republican candidates running for governor complied with this request.

The Maryland Latino Legislative Caucus of Maryland hosted the second Republican gubernatorial candidate forum on November 8, 2021. Robin Ficker was the lone Republican candidate to attend the event, where he advocated for cutting the state sales tax, starting statewide English classes, and reopening schools.

The Maryland State Bar Association hosted individual, hour-long conversations with all running candidates from December 6 to December 10, 2021. Daniel Cox, Robin Ficker, and Kelly Schulz were invited to attend the forum. Cox was unable to attend the forum on December 10, 2021, due to the General Assembly's special session.

On December 10, 2021, the Committee for Montgomery annual legislative breakfast featured a forum with Republican and Democratic candidates for governor. The forum was moderated by Ovetta Wiggins, and the only Republican candidate to attend was Robin Ficker.

On March 8 and March 9, 2022, the Maryland League of Conservation Voters collaborated with Maryland Matters, the Baltimore County NAACP, the Maryland Sierra Club, and the Chesapeake Climate Action Network to host two gubernatorial forums that focused on the topic of climate change. Robin Ficker was the only Republican candidate to attend the forums, as candidates Dan Cox and Kelly Schulz declined invitations to attend. The first forum took place at the Riggs Alumni Center at the University of Maryland at College Park and was moderated by Josh Kurtz, Tonya Harrison-Edwards, and Rona Kobell, and the second forum took place at the Ungar Athenaeum at Goucher College and was moderated by Kurtz, Staci Hartwell, Sheilah Kast, and Stella Krajick.

On March 30, 2022, Bowie State University and the Maryland Black Chamber of Commerce hosted a gubernatorial forum for candidates to share their vision and agenda on economic development in Maryland. Robin Ficker was the only Republican candidate to attend the forum, which was moderated by Micheal McGee.

On April 30, 2022, Frostburg State University, the Allegany College of Maryland, and Garrett College hosted a gubernatorial forum at Frostburg, which was attended by candidates Dan Cox and Robin Ficker. The forum was moderated by Amanda Mangan, and questions were asked by a group of students from the three hosting universities, Allegany High School, and Bishop Walsh School.

Fundraising

Polling

Results

Democratic primary

Campaign
The first two major Democratic candidates to announce were state Comptroller Peter Franchot and former Prince George's County executive Rushern Baker. Both Franchot and Baker were seen as the leading candidates in the race, but early polling showed that more than 40 percent of likely voters were still undecided. With high name recognition and a big war-chest built up over years without primary challengers as Comptroller, Franchot entered the race as the nominal frontrunner.

As the campaign progressed, more candidates began entering the race, with Franchot holding onto a solid lead in polling as the race expanded to a four-way battle between Franchot, Baker, author and former Robin Hood Foundation CEO Wes Moore, and former Democratic National Committee chairman Tom Perez. On June 10, 2022, Baker suspended his campaign for governor, his campaign having suffered from financial challenges and decreasing party support, creating an opening in voter-rich Prince George's County. Polling conducted later that month by Goucher College showed Franchot, Moore, and Perez in a statistical tie, with each of the three frontrunners having enough resources and endorsements to compete for undecided voters.

In addition to Franchot, Baker, Moore, and Perez, six other candidates also ran for the Democratic nomination, including former nonprofit executive Jon Baron, former Maryland attorney general Doug Gansler, perennial candidate Ralph Jaffe, former Obama administration official Ashwani Jain, former Secretary of Education John King Jr., and former Bread and Roses Party founder Jerome Segal. Two other candidates, former Republican Anne Arundel County executive Laura Neuman and tech company founder Mike Rosenbaum, also declared their candidacy but had dropped out before the primaries.

Candidates

Nominee
 Wes Moore, author and former CEO of the Robin Hood Foundation
 Running mate: Aruna Miller, former state delegate for the 15th district (2010–2019) and candidate for MD-06 in 2018

Eliminated in primary
 Jon Baron, former nonprofit executive, expert in evidence-based policy, and former federal official
 Running mate: Natalie Williams, former TV producer and communications professional
 Peter Franchot, Comptroller of Maryland (2007–2023) and nominee for MD-08 in 1988
 Running mate: Monique Anderson-Walker, former Prince George's County councilmember (2018–2021)
 Doug Gansler, former Attorney General of Maryland (2007–2015) and candidate for governor in 2014
 Running mate: Candace Hollingsworth, former mayor of Hyattsville (2015–2020)
 Ralph Jaffe, perennial candidate
 Running mate: Mark Greben
 Ashwani Jain, former Obama administration official
 Running mate: LaTrece Hawkins Lytes, community activist
 John King Jr., former United States Secretary of Education (2016–2017)
 Running mate: Michelle Siri, executive director of the Women's Law Center of Maryland
 Tom Perez, former Democratic National Committee Chairman (2017–2021), former United States Secretary of Labor (2013–2017), and former Maryland secretary of labor (2007–2009)
 Running mate: Shannon Sneed, former Baltimore City councilmember (2016–2020)
 Jerome Segal, founder of the Bread and Roses Party (2018–2021), candidate for President of the United States in 2020, and Democratic candidate for U.S. Senate in 2018
 Running mate: Justinian M. Dispenza, Galena town councilmember (2021–present)

Withdrawn
 Rushern Baker, former Prince George's County executive (2010–2018) and candidate for governor in 2018
 Running mate: Nancy Navarro, Montgomery County councilmember (2009–2022)
 Laura Neuman, former Republican Anne Arundel County executive (2013–2014) (endorsed Franchot)
 Mike Rosenbaum, founder of Catalyte

Declined
Angela Alsobrooks, Prince George's County executive (2018–present) and former Prince George's County State Attorney (2011–2018) (ran for re-election, endorsed Moore)
Calvin Ball III, Howard County executive (2018–present) (ran for re-election)
 Anthony Brown, U.S. representative for Maryland's 4th congressional district (2017–2023), former lieutenant governor and nominee for governor in 2014 (ran for attorney general)
Brooke Lierman, state delegate for the 46th district (2015–2023) (ran for Comptroller)
Heather Mizeur, former state delegate for the 20th district (2007–2015) and candidate for governor in 2014 (ran for MD-01)
 Kweisi Mfume, U.S. representative for Maryland's 7th congressional district (2020–present) and former president of the NAACP (1996–2004) (running for re-election, endorsed Moore)
John A. Olszewski Jr., Baltimore County executive (2018–present) and former state delegate for the 6th district (2006–2015) (ran for re-election, endorsed Perez)
Steuart Pittman, Anne Arundel County executive (2018–present) (running for re-election, endorsed Moore)
 John Sarbanes, U.S. representative for Maryland's 3rd congressional district (2007–present) (ran for re-election)
David Trone, U.S. representative for Maryland's 6th congressional district (2019–present) (ran for re-election)
Mary L. Washington, state senator for the 43rd district (2019–present) (ran for re-election)

Endorsements

Debates and forums
The Montgomery County Renters Alliance hosted the first Democratic gubernatorial primary forum on September 21, 2021. Candidates who attended included Peter Franchot, Doug Gansler, Ashwani Jain, John King Jr., Wes Moore, and Tom Perez. Rushern Baker was also due to attend, but withdrew following the death of his wife, Christa Beverly Baker, on September 18, 2021. Jon Baron, who, along with Mike Rosenbaum, was not invited to the forum, attended a town hall hosted by the Renters Alliance on September 29, 2021.

A second gubernatorial candidate forum was hosted on October 7, 2021, by the Anne Arundel County Democratic Party. Candidates Rushern Baker, Jon Baron, Peter Franchot, Ashwani Jain, John King Jr., and Mike Rosenbaum all attended the forum, where they discussed their stances on education, criminal reform, healthcare, and economic reform policy. Tom Perez was also invited, but could not attend because of a schedule conflict.

The third gubernatorial candidate forum was hosted by the Legislative Black Caucus of Maryland on October 14, 2021. All nine declared Democratic candidates attended the forum, where they informed voters of color about their policies surrounding the Black Agenda. At the end of the forum, Darryl Barnes asked all of the attending candidates to post a Black agenda on their websites by November 1; candidates Peter Franchot, Wes Moore, John King Jr., Tom Perez, Jon Baron, Doug Gansler, and Mike Rosenbaum complied with Barnes' request, with Franchot being the first candidate to present a cohesive plan. Ashwani Jain did not release a specific Black agenda, saying that part of his campaign platform already includes a Black agenda. Rushern Baker said at the reception that he would also produce a plan in the following weeks, but added that one was unnecessary because of previous elected Black leaders' plans. Baker would end up posting his Black agenda on November 4, three days after Barnes' deadline.

The fourth gubernatorial candidate forum was hosted by the Climate X-Change Maryland and the Rebuild Maryland Coalition in partnership with the Chesapeake Climate Action Network on November 1, 2021. Candidates Jon Baron, Doug Gansler, John King Jr., Ashwani Jain, Tom Perez, and Mike Rosenbaum attended the forum, where they informed voters about the policies they would enact to fight climate change and reduce greenhouse gas emissions. Candidates Rushern Baker, Peter Franchot, and Wes Moore were also invited, but did not attend the forum.

The fifth gubernatorial candidate forum was hosted by the Prince George's County NAACP on November 4, 2021, with Jon Baron, Doug Gansler, and Tom Perez, and on November 8, 2021, with Wes Moore, Mike Rosenbaum, Rushern Baker, and Ashwani Jain. Peter Franchot was due to attend the first forum, but could not attend due to technical difficulties. Several topics, including police brutality, environmental injustice, and transparency among state agencies, were discussed at the forums. John King Jr. did not participate in this forum because he teaches an undergraduate course on education policy at the University of Maryland in College Park.

The sixth gubernatorial candidate forum was hosted by the Maryland Latino Legislative Caucus on November 8, 2021. Candidates Jon Baron, Peter Franchot, Doug Gansler, John King Jr., and Tom Perez attended the forum where they answered questions about expanding healthcare access, economic opportunities, education, and cabinet diversity.

The seventh gubernatorial candidate forum was hosted by the St. Ignatius Justice and Peace Committee at the St. Ignatius Church on November 16, 2021. All candidates who received more than 1% percent support in available opinion polls were invited to the forum. Candidates Rushern Baker, Peter Franchot, Doug Gansler, John King Jr., Wes Moore, Tom Perez, and Mike Rosenbaum confirmed their availability for the conversation, but only Gansler, Moore, Perez, and Rosenbaum attended. Attending candidates answered questions about cleaning the Chesapeake Bay, tackling climate change, homelessness, poverty, white supremacy, immigration, the defund the police movement, critical race theory, abortion, and death with dignity.

The eighth gubernatorial candidate forum was hosted by the Maryland Democratic Party on November 22, 2021. All Democratic candidates were invited to attend the forum, where they discussed economic issues, such as the state's $2.5 billion budget surplus, inflation, vaccine and mask mandates, and unions. Candidates Rushern Baker, Jon Baron, Doug Gansler, Ashwani Jain, John King, Wes Moore, and Tom Perez attended the forum.

The Maryland State Bar Association hosted individual, hour-long conversations with all running candidates from December 6 to December 10, 2021. All Democratic candidates attended the forum. Mike Rosenbaum intended on attending the forum on December 7, but withdrew from the debate after suspending his campaign on November 30, 2021.

On December 10, 2021, the Committee for Montgomery annual legislative breakfast featured a forum with Republican and Democratic candidates for governor. Candidates Rushern Baker, Jon Baron, Doug Gansler, Ashwani Jain, John King Jr., Wes Moore, and Tom Perez attended the forum, which was moderated by Ovetta Wiggins. Peter Franchot did not attend the forum because of a commitment he made several months prior to the debate to attend a minority business event in Anne Arundel County.

On January 5, 2022, the Maryland Democratic Party hosted a gubernatorial candidate forum that focused on the topic of education. Candidates Rushern Baker, Jon Baron, Doug Gansler, Ashwani Jain, John King Jr., Wes Moore, and Tom Perez attended the event, which was moderated by Maryland Matters editor Danielle Gaines. Peter Franchot did not attend the forum because he attended a campaign fundraiser in Cecil County.

On January 26, 2022, the Maryland State Education Association hosted a gubernatorial forum that focused on the topic of education. All candidates who said that they would pursue the group's endorsement were invited to the event, which was moderated by Cheryl Bost, the group's president. Jerome Segal was the only candidate not to attend the forum.

On March 8 and March 9, 2022, the Maryland League of Conservation Voters collaborated with Maryland Matters, the Baltimore County NAACP, the Maryland Sierra Club, and the Chesapeake Climate Action Network to host two gubernatorial forums that focused on the topic of climate change. Candidates Jon Baron, Doug Gansler, Ashwani Jain, John King, Laura Neuman and Jerome Segal attended both forums, while Wes Moore and Tom Perez only attended the first event. Peter Franchot initially intended on attending the second forum, but withdrew due to an "unexpected personal matter". Rushern Baker initially confirmed he would attend both events, but later withdrew from both. The first forum took place at the Riggs Alumni Center at the University of Maryland at College Park and was moderated by Josh Kurtz, Tonya Harrison-Edwards, and Rona Kobell, and the second forum took place at the Ungar Athenaeum at Goucher College and was moderated by Kurtz, Sheilah Kast, and Stella Krajick.

On March 15, 2022, the Maryland Democratic Party hosted its second Burgers & Brews Gubernatorial Candidate Forum in Frederick, Maryland. Candidates Jon Baron, Doug Gansler, Ashwani Jain, John King Jr., Laura Neuman, and Jerome Segal attended the event, which was moderated by Maryland Matters editor Danielle Gaines.

On March 30, 2022, Bowie State University and the Maryland Black Chamber of Commerce hosted a gubernatorial forum for candidates to share their vision and agenda on economic development in Maryland. Candidates Jon Baron, Rushern Baker, Peter Franchot, Doug Gansler, Ashwani Jain, John King Jr., Wes Moore, and Tom Perez attended the forum, which was moderated by Micheal McGee.

On April 3, 2022, the Eleanor and Franklin Roosevelt Democratic Club hosted a gubernatorial forum in Greenbelt, Maryland, which was moderated by Dave Zahren and attended by candidates Jon Baron, Doug Gansler, Ashwani Jain, Tom Perez, and Jerome Segal.

On April 20, 2022, Bikemore and The Real News Network hosted a gubernatorial forum focused on the topic of transportation. Candidates who received more than 10 percent in recent polling and completed a written questionnaire prior to the event were invited to attend. Candidates Rushern Baker, John King Jr., Peter Franchot, and Tom Perez participated in the forum, while Wes Moore opted out of the debate.

On April 26, 2022, Coppin State University hosted a gubernatorial forum focused on the topics of economic development, crime, and education. Candidates Rushern Baker, Jon Baron, Peter Franchot, Doug Gansler, Wes Moore, Tom Perez, and Jerome Segal attended the forum, which was moderated by WMAR-TV news anchor Kelly Swoope.

On April 30, 2022, Frostburg State University, the Allegany College of Maryland, and Garrett College hosted a gubernatorial forum at Frostburg, which was attended by candidates Rushern Baker, Ashwani Jain, and John King Jr. The forum was moderated by Amanda Mangan, and questions were asked by a group of students from the three hosting universities, Allegany High School, and Bishop Walsh School.

Fundraising

Polling
Graphical summary

Results

Independent and third-party candidates

Candidates

Declared
David Harding (Working Class), candidate for Mayor of Baltimore in 2020
Running mate: Cathy White
 Running mate: Christiana Logansmith, U.S. Navy veteran and small business owner

Failed to qualify, write-in campaign
 Kyle Sefcik (Independent), MMA fighter and small business owner
 Running mate: Katie Lee, personal trainer

Debates and forums
David Lashar attended the gubernatorial candidate forum hosted by the Legislative Black Caucus of Maryland on October 14, 2021. At the end of the forum, Darryl Barnes challenged all of the attending candidates to post a Black agenda on their campaign websites by November 1; in response, Lashar posted a "Libertarian Black Agenda" plan on his campaign website.

The Maryland State Bar Association hosted individual, hour-long conversations with all running candidates from December 6 to December 10, 2021. Lashar attended the forum on December 8, 2021.

Lashar attended the Committee for Montgomery Legislative Breakfast gubernatorial forum on December 10, 2021.

Lashar attended both of the gubernatorial forums on climate change on March 8 and 9, 2022.

Fundraising

General election

Campaign 

Moore's campaign framed Cox as someone who would be "dangerous" in the governor's office, highlighting his role in spreading falsehoods about the 2020 presidential election and the January 6 United States Capitol attack. After the primary, Cox removed references to his role in challenging the 2020 presidential election results from his campaign website and deactivated his account on Gab, a website that has been described as a social media haven for white supremacists and neo-Nazis and was used by the perpetrator of the Pittsburgh synagogue shooting. He later described himself as a candidate with a "middle temperament approach" that was willing to work across the aisle.

Cox's campaign sought to tie Moore to the national Democratic party and President Joe Biden. He also sought to paint Moore as a communist, citing Moore's requirement that people attending fundraisers and campaign rallies be vaccinated against COVID-19. Moore countered that his service in the military and work on Wall Street and in finance would make calling him a communist a "bad stretch."

Cox was critical of Moore's refusal to debate him. In response to these criticisms, Moore said that he was "excited" to debate Cox. However, Moore's team initially declined to participate in debates with Cox, saying that they would "not otherwise share the stage with him and participate in anything that amplifies his dangerous and decisive rhetoric". On August 31, 2022, Moore agreed to a televised debate by Maryland Public Television with Cox on October 12. Moore, when asked if he wished to share the stage with Cox again following the debate, said, "I think I'm good."

Predictions

Endorsements

Debates and forums

Fundraising

Polling
Graphical summary

Results

Results by county

Counties that flipped from Republican to Democratic
 Anne Arundel (largest municipality: Glen Burnie)
 Baltimore County (largest municipality: Dundalk)
 Frederick (largest municipality: Frederick)
 Howard (largest municipality: Columbia)
 Kent (largest municipality: Chestertown)
 Talbot (largest municipality: Easton)

See also
 Elections in Maryland
 2022 United States elections
 2022 Maryland Attorney General election
 2022 United States Senate election in Maryland
 2022 Maryland Senate election
 2022 Maryland Comptroller election
 2022 United States House of Representatives elections in Maryland
 2022 United States gubernatorial elections
 2022 Maryland House of Delegates election

Notes

Partisan clients

References

External links 
 Candidates at Vote Smart
 Candidates at Ballotpedia

Official campaign websites
 Dan Cox (R) for Governor
 David Lashar (L) for Governor
 Wes Moore (D) for Governor
 Nancy Wallace (G) for Governor

Gubernatorial
2022
Maryland